Pasadena Transit, formerly known as Pasadena Area Rapid Transit System (Pasadena ARTS), is the transit bus service in the city of Pasadena, California. The system was launched as a single shuttle route ahead of the 1994 World Cup, at the Rose Bowl. The system greatly expanded in 2001 and ahead of the opening of the Metro Gold Line (now known as the L Line) in 2003. , the system consists of eight lines, which are operated under contract by First Transit, with a fleet of 32 buses.

History

Pasadena launched its transit bus system in June 1994, in time for the 1994 FIFA World Cup, held at Pasadena's Rose Bowl stadium. Known as the Pasadena Area Rapid Transit System (ARTS), it consisted of a single fare-free shuttle line called the Downtown Route which connected Old Pasadena, Civic Center, Playhouse District, and South Lake Business District.

A second route was added in mid-1996, connecting to the Downtown Route at Old Pasadena; the new Uptown Route served residents in the northwest and eastern areas of Pasadena, connecting them with the Civic Center, the North Lake shopping area, and also serving the high-density senior housing along Villa.

In 2001, anticipating the opening of the Metro Gold Line (now known as the L Line) in 2003, Pasadena restructured the transit system serve the six new light rail stations. ARTS was restructured into four routes in 2001, which are operated today as Lines 10, 20, 31/32, and 40. Two additional routes were added in June 2003: Routes 51/52 and 60.

When the Gold Line opened in July 2003, Pasadena ARTS also began charging a 50 cent fare, which allowed the agency to enter into interagency transfer agreements that enabled ARTS riders to transfer onto the Gold Line or buses from other agencies for an extra 25 cents.

In 2010, the Great Recession that was being felt around the nation also impacted Pasadena's budget, forcing the city to cut service including the elimination of Sunday service; in addition, the aging vehicles dragged down the agency's on-time performance into the low-80% range, and ridership fell by 13% that year. Federal grants allowed Pasadena ARTS to modify Route 10 and increase Route 20 frequency in July 2013; additional service improvements included an increase in Route 31 frequency in fall 2015 and the resumption of Sunday service in July 2018.

The service was rebranded as Pasadena Transit starting on December 1, 2015. The new logo and branding materials were developed by students at Pasadena's ArtCenter College of Design.

Service

Fixed route system 
Pasadena Transit operates nine routes, each connecting with at least one Metro L Line station. Four of the lines (10, 51/52, and 60) are classified as "Feeder" lines, which connect low-density residential neighborhoods to work and shopping destinations, and other modes of transit. The other four lines (20, 31/32, and 40) are classified as "Local" lines, which connect the Metro stations with the city's attractions and high-density residential neighborhoods.

Route 20 is the busiest in the system, with nearly 2.5× the daily boardings as the next-highest route operated by Pasadena Transit, 31/32.

Effective July 1, 2018, service is operated seven days a week, with the exception of six major holidays (New Year's Day, Memorial Day, Independence Day (July 4), Labor Day, Thanksgiving Day and Christmas Day).

Route overview 

Notes

Dial-a-ride service 
In addition to its fixed routes, Pasadena Transit also operates an on-demand ("dial-a-ride") service for senior and disabled residents in the city of Pasadena and neighboring communities in Altadena, San Marino, and unincorporated Los Angeles County. The Dial-a-Ride service started in 1984 and began serving San Marino residents in 1989. Areas of Kinneloa and East San Gabriel were added in 1990, and Altadena joined in 1993.

Fares
Fares may be paid by cash. In September 2015, Pasadena Transit began participating in the regional Transit Access Pass (TAP Card) farecard program. Passes are kept on the TAP Card. Pasadena Transit will honor the regional EZ Transit Pass and all Metrolink tickets as full fare. Youth, senior, and disabled riders must use an appropriate Reduced Fare TAP Card in conjunction with an appropriate ID. Up to two children ages five and under may ride for free with one paid Full (adult) fare.

Initially, the base fare was 50 cents (youth and discount riders: 25 cents) when Pasadena ARTS began collecting fares in July 2003. The transfer fee to another transit agency was an additional 25 cents.

Fares were raised in 2009 to 75 cents (adult), 50 cents (youth), and 35 cents (discount). Passengers who pay with cash stored on a TAP Card, can ride for 2.5 hours, and will get discounted inter-agency transfers.

Fleet and facilities

Fleet
The six original buses when Pasadena ARTS began were wrapped in a distinct design, themed for the Visual Arts, Symphony, New Year's Day, Historical Landmarks, and Multicultural; they were billed as "Art that really moves you". In 2006, the bus livery was redesigned to incorporate each of the six original designs as a unified pattern for all buses. The first major replacement of the fleet was completed by 2013.

Facilities
Pasadena Transit is managed by the city's Department of Transportation and is housed in a building at 221 E Walnut St. Operations and maintenance are handled by contractors, using a leased facility at 303 North Allen Ave. There are two additional lots for overflow parking and bus storage.

References

See also
L Line (Los Angeles Metro)

Transportation in Pasadena, California
Bus transportation in California
Public transportation in Los Angeles County, California
Altadena, California
San Gabriel Valley